Entre Ríos Municipality may refer to:
 Entre Ríos Municipality, Cochabamba, Bolivia
 Entre Ríos Municipality, Tarija, Bolivia

Municipality name disambiguation pages